Sarguja Lok Sabha constituency is one of the eleven Lok Sabha (parliamentary) constituencies in Chhattisgarh state in central India.

Assembly segments
Sarguja Lok Sabha constituency is reserved for Scheduled Tribes (ST) candidates. It is composed of the following assembly segments:

Members of Parliament

Election results

General election 2019

General elections 2014

General elections 2009

See also
 Surguja district
 List of Constituencies of the Lok Sabha

References

Lok Sabha constituencies in Chhattisgarh
Surguja district